Armour Hills is a neighborhood located in Kansas City, Missouri. It is bounded on the west by Brookside Road, on the north by 65th Street, on the east by Oak Street and the south by Gregory Boulevard. The name of this area derives from the fact that the land was owned by members of the Armour family of the Armour and Company.

The land was purchased from the Armours by J.C. Nichols in May 1922, and construction continued for the next decade.

Nichols stipulated that each home should look unique. So, the 1,068 homes in this neighborhood range from Tudor Revival, Cape Cod, and Dutch Colonials built with brick, stone, and wood in many different sizes.

See also
List of neighborhoods in Kansas City, Missouri
Brookside, Kansas City, Missouri

External links
 Brookside Map

References

Neighborhoods in Kansas City, Missouri
Populated places established in 1922